Korun is masculine name or surname. According to some sources it has its origin in Turkish language. According to some other sources this masculine name is based on feminine name Korona. Alternative variant forms of names and surnames based on this name include Koruna, Korunović, Korać (in cases when it is not based on the farrier's hammer) and Korić.

See also 
 Korun Aramija
 Korun Koča Anđelković
 Theodor Corona Musachi

References